The Rivia ([]) is a cantillation mark commonly found in the Torah, Haftarah, and other biblical texts. The Aram word ) has its Hebrew counter part  Rivi'i, with other variant English spellings. Its meaning is 'the fourth'.

Rivia is considered to have medium strength. It is stronger than a Pashta or Tevir, but weaker than a Zakef or Tipcha.

The Rivia can occur either by itself, or following one or two Munachs. When there are two Munachs prior to a Rivia, the first Munach has a long melody, and the second one is short. When there is one Munach, it is short.

Based on its translation with fourth in printouts it is represented by a diamond-shaped mark. However in manuscripts it's just a dot.

Total occurrences

Melody
The Rivia is read in a slow, downward tone, with a pause in the middle breaking upward.

References

Cantillation marks